Langshaw is a rural locality in the Gympie Region, Queensland, Australia. In the  Langshaw had a population of 169 people.

History 
Eel Creek Provisional School opened on 1876. It closed in 1896. It reopened in January 1914. On 1 April 1926, it became Eel Creek State School. In 1936, tenders were called to erect a new school building. In 1948, it was renamed Landshaw State School. It closed on 25 August 1962. It was at approx 1576 Eel Creek Road.

Heritage listings 
Langshaw has the following heritage sites:

 Upper Eel Creek Road: Langshaw Hall
 1574 Eel Creek Road: Langshaw State School

Amenities 
Langshaw Public Hall is at 1571 Eel Creek Road.

References 

Gympie Region
Localities in Queensland